The 1999–2000 New Jersey Devils season was the 26th season for the National Hockey League franchise that was established on June 11, 1974, and 18th season since the franchise relocated from Colorado prior to the 1982–83 NHL season.

After firing head coach Robbie Ftorek on March 23, the team won their second Stanley Cup championship on June 10, 2000 in a double-overtime victory in Game 6 of the 2000 Stanley Cup Finals against the Dallas Stars.

Off-season
The summer of 1999 for the New Jersey Devils leading up to the franchise's 18th season in the NHL since the franchise relocated from Colorado was a difficult one, especially after being eliminated in the Eastern Conference Semifinals to the New York Rangers in five games in 1997, and in the Eastern Conference Quarterfinals the previous two years: to the Ottawa Senators in six games in 1998 and to the Pittsburgh Penguins in seven games in 1999, the latter coming on Continental Airlines Arena ice. But with the addition of Claude Lemieux, the 1995 Conn Smythe Trophy winner returning to the Devils' uniform, the franchise were poised for another run for the Stanley Cup.

Preseason

Regular season

The Devils finished the regular season with the fewest power-play opportunities (274), but they finished 2nd overall in power-play percentage, with 20.07% (55 for 274).

Season standings

Schedule and results

Playoffs

Eastern Conference Quarterfinals

Eastern Conference semifinals

Eastern Conference finals

Stanley Cup Finals

New Jersey advanced to the Stanley Cup Finals with home ice advantage as the fourth seed, becoming the lowest seeded team to have home ice advantage in the Stanley Cup finals. This record was later broken by the Devils again in 2012.

Media

Television coverage was on Fox Sports Net with Mike Emrick and Chico Resch and radio coverage was on WABC 770 with Mike Milbury.

Player statistics

Regular season
Scoring

Goaltending

Playoffs
Scoring

Goaltending

Note: GP = Games played; G = Goals; A = Assists; Pts = Points; +/- = Plus/minus; PIM = Penalty minutes; PPG = Power-play goals; SHG = Short-handed goals; GWG = Game-winning goals
      MIN = Minutes played; W = Wins; L = Losses; T/OT = Ties/overtime losses; GA = Goals against; GAA = Goals against average; SO = Shutouts; SA = Shots against; SV = Shots saved; SV% = Save percentage;

Awards and records

Awards

50th NHL All-Star Game
New Jersey Devils NHL All-Star representatives at the 50th NHL All-Star Game in Toronto, Ontario, at the Air Canada Centre.
Martin Brodeur, G, (North America All-Stars)
Patrik Elias, LW, (World All-Stars)
Scott Gomez, C, (North America All-Stars)
Scott Stevens, D, (North America All-Stars)

Draft picks
The Devils' draft picks at the 1999 NHL Entry Draft at the FleetCenter in Boston.

See also
1999–2000 NHL season

Notes

References

 

New Jersey Devils seasons
New Jersey Devils
New Jersey Devils
New Jersey Devils
New Jersey Devils
New Jersey Devils
20th century in East Rutherford, New Jersey
Eastern Conference (NHL) championship seasons
Meadowlands Sports Complex
Stanley Cup championship seasons